Rob Miles (born 23 July 1957) is a Microsoft Most Valuable Professional, and a former lecturer in programming C Sharp and other elements of software engineering at the University of Hull. 

Miles has given speeches worldwide on topics including C Sharp, Microsoft XNA, Windows Mobile development and embedded development using the .NET Micro Framework. He has written an XNA book, and he co-authored a book about the .NET Micro Framework with Donald Thompson.

Miles has also repeatedly been a member of the judging team of the yearly Microsoft Imagine Cup. In 2009, he was selected as a Captain of the software design competition.

Miles currently hosts a monthly Arduino Hardware Group as part of the Hull Digital Group at The Centre for Digital Innovation Beta.

Bibliography 
 Microsoft XNA Game Studio 2.0: Learn Programming Now!, Rob Miles. Microsoft Press, 2008 
 Microsoft XNA Game Studio 3.0: Learn Programming Now!, Rob Miles. Microsoft Press, 2009 
 Embedded Programming with the Microsoft .NET Micro Framework, Donald Thompson, Rob Miles. Microsoft Press, 2007 
 More Microsoft XNA Game Studio 3.0: Create Great Games: Learn Programming Now!, Rob Miles. Microsoft Press, 2009 
 Learn C# Now Toolkit, John Sharp, Rob Miles (Author). Microsoft Press, 2008 
 Introduction to Programming Through Game Development Using Microsoft XNA Game Studio, Rob Miles. Microsoft Press, 2009 
 Uml & Java for Software Development, Rob Miles. John Wiley & Sons, 2001

References

External links 
 robmiles.com - Personal blog

Living people
Academics of the University of Hull
British computer programmers
British computer scientists
British science writers
1957 births